Hermann Monter (13 December 1926 – 23 September 1999) was a German footballer who played for SV Saar 05 Saarbrücken and the Saarland national team as a forward.

References

1926 births
1999 deaths
German footballers
Saar footballers
Saarland international footballers
SV Saar 05 Saarbrücken players
Association football forwards